Satr or SATR may refer to:
Reconquista Airport, Argentina (by ICAO code)
Satr, a period of anonymity in Mustaali
 Small Arms Transmitter Receiver (a technology associated with Laser Tag Equipment)
 Satr - Intimate parts in Islam

See also
Dawr-e-Satr, a period of anonymity in Shia Islam
Sadr (disambiguation)